Arabic Colleges in southern India refer to the educational institutes of higher Islamic learning. They are sometimes also known as Oriental Title Colleges in Kerala, and they are the near equivalent of north Indian madrasas. Graduates from Arabic Colleges can sit privately for the state recognized "Afzal-ul-Ulama" credential, which qualifies them to serve as Arabic Language teachers in state educational institutions.

A madrasa in Kerala is an extra-curricular institution where children receive basic Islamic education.

There are mainly two types of Arabic Colleges in Kerala—the 'traditionalist' Shafi'ite Arabic Colleges and the Salafi Movement-inspired Colleges. Most of the colleges come under the first category.

Arabic Colleges (based on funding and affiliation)

 Government Grant Aided & State University Affiliated Arabic Colleges (Oriental Title Colleges)
 Unaided & State University Affiliated Arabic Colleges
 Unaided & Non-affiliated Arabic Colleges

Programmes offered 
Source: Government of Kerala University of Calicut

In Government Grant Aided Arabic Colleges affiliated to State Universities

Higher Secondary level 
 Afzal-ul-Ulama Preliminary

Undergraduate Degree level (Bachelor of Arts or Commerce) 
 Afzal-ul-Ulama
 Functional Arabic  .
 Economics with Islamic Finance
 English with Islamic History
 Islamic Finance

Post Graduate level (Master of Arts) 
 Post Afzal-ul-Ulama
 Islamic Finance
 Arabic

Government Aided Arabic Colleges (Oriental Title Colleges) 
Source: Government of Kerala University of Calicut

Unaided and Non-affiliated Arabic Colleges 
Source: University of Kerala (doctoral thesis, 2011)

 Al Jamia, Santhapuram, Malappuram
 Markazu Al Saqafathu Sunniyya, Karanthur, Kozhikode
 Darul Huda Islamic University, Chemmad, Malappuram
 Jamia Nooriyya Arabiyya, Pattikkad, Malappuram
 Jamia Nadviyya, Edavananna, Malappuram
 Ilahiyya College, Thirurkad, Malappuram
 Islahiya College, Chennamangaloor, Kozhikkode
 Jamia Salafiyya, Pulikkal, Malppuram
 Islamiyya College, Vadanappally, Trichur

References 

Education in Kerala
Islamic education in India
Higher education in India
Seminaries and theological colleges
Madrasas
Law schools
Islamic education
Islamic terminology
Islamic seminaries and theological colleges
Institutes of higher Islamic learning in Kerala